The 1993 Hellmann's Cup was a men's ATP tournament held in Santiago, Chile on outdoor clay courts that was part of the World Series of the 1993 ATP Tour. It was the inaugural edition of the tournament and was held from 25 October until 1 November 1997. Unseeded Javier Frana won the singles title.

Finals

Singles

 Javier Frana defeated  Emilio Sánchez 7–5, 3–6, 6–3
 It was Frana's 3rd title of the year and the 7th of his career.

Doubles

 Mike Bauer /  David Rikl defeated  Christer Allgårdh /  Brian Devening 7–6, 6–4
 It was Bauer's 2nd title of the year and the 10th of his career. It was Rikl's only title of the year and the 3rd of his career.

References

Chile Open (tennis)
Movistar Open
Movistar Open